The Dávid family (Slovak: Dávidovci z Turčianskeho Petra, Hungarian: Dávid de Túróczszentpéter) was a Slovak noble family in the Kingdom of Hungary, who owned estates in the Turóc County, Upper Hungary (today Turiec region, present-day Slovakia). In the 13th century, the Dávids were one of the many Slovak local noble families with title zeman (the lowest-ranking nobility in the Kingdom, placed under the baron). The ancestors of the Dávid family were an older noble family of Záturecký from Záturčie (now part of Martin, Slovakia). Dávids had properties and manor houses in Záturčie, Istebné, Turčiansky Peter, Sasinkovo, Malý Báb and Veľky Báb.

In 1772 Karol (Charles) Dávid and his son Anton were promoted to Barons by Holy Roman Empress Maria Theresa of Austria, the Queen of Hungary.

See also

External links
History of Záturčie

References
Rodové erby na Slovensku I. (Martin 1980)
Rodové erby na Slovesnku II. (Martin 1986)

Hungarian nobility